McQuilken is a surname. Notable people with the surname include:

Jamie McQuilken (born 1974), Scottish footballer
Kim McQuilken (born 1951), American football player
Michael McQuilken, American theatre director and musician
Paul McQuilken (born 1981), Scottish footballer

Anglicised Scottish Gaelic-language surnames